Rhipidarctia is a genus of moths in the family Erebidae.

Species
Rhipidarctia aurora Kiriakoff, 1957
Rhipidarctia cinctella (Kiriakoff, 1953)
Rhipidarctia conradti (Oberthür, 1911)
Rhipidarctia crameri Kiriakoff, 1961
Rhipidarctia flaviceps (Hampson, 1898)
Rhipidarctia forsteri (Kiriakoff, 1953)
Rhipidarctia invaria (Walker, 1856)
Rhipidarctia lutea (Holland, 1893)
Rhipidarctia miniata Kiriakoff, 1957
Rhipidarctia pareclecta (Holland, 1893)
Rhipidarctia postrosea (Rothschild, 1913)
Rhipidarctia rhodosoma Kiriakoff, 1957
Rhipidarctia rubrovitta (Aurivillius, 1904)
Rhipidarctia saturata Kiriakoff, 1957
Rhipidarctia silacea (Plötz, 1880)
Rhipidarctia subminiata Kiriakoff, 1959
Rhipidarctia xenops (Kiriakoff, 1957)

Former species
Rhipidarctia syntomia (Plötz, 1880)

References

Natural History Museum Lepidoptera generic names catalog

Syntomini
Moth genera